Krishna Bahadur Thapa (born 8 August 1955) is a Nepalese professional football manager.

Career
He worked as manager of the Nepal U22 team. In 2011 and 2012 he coached the Nepal national football team. Later he became the head coach of the LH MMC

Honours

Nepal
 South Asian Games Silver medal: 1987

References

External links
Profile at Sccerway.com
Profile at Soccerpunter.com

1955 births
Living people
Nepalese footballers
Nepal international footballers
Nepalese football managers
Nepal national football team managers
Place of birth missing (living people)
South Asian Games medalists in football
South Asian Games silver medalists for Nepal